Alexander I ( – 9 October 1934), also known as Alexander the Unifier, was the prince regent of the Kingdom of Serbia from 1914 and later the King of Yugoslavia from 1921 to 1934 (prior to 1929 the state was known as the Kingdom of Serbs, Croats and Slovenes). He was assassinated by the Bulgarian Vlado Chernozemski of the Internal Macedonian Revolutionary Organization, during a 1934 state visit to France. Having sat on the throne for 13 years, he is the longest-reigning monarch of the Kingdom of Yugoslavia.

Early life

Alexander Karađorđević was born on 16 December 1888 in the Principality of Montenegro as the fourth child (second son) of Peter Karađorđević (son of Prince Alexander of Serbia who thirty years earlier in 1858 was forced to abdicate and surrender power in Serbia to the rival House of Obrenović) and Princess Zorka of Montenegro (eldest daughter of Prince Nicholas of Montenegro). Despite enjoying support from the Russian Empire, at the time of Alexander's birth and early childhood, the House of Karađorđević was in political exile, with family members scattered all over Europe, unable to return to Serbia.

Serbia had recently been transformed from a principality into a kingdom under the Obrenovićs, who ruled with strong support from Austria-Hungary. The antagonism between the two rival royal houses was such, that, after the assassination of Prince Mihailo Obrenović in 1868 (an event Karađorđevićs were suspected of taking part in), the Obrenovićs resorted to making constitutional changes, specifically proclaiming the Karađorđevićs banned from entering Serbia and stripping them of their civic rights.

Alexander was two when his mother, Princess Zorka, died in 1890 from complications while giving birth to his younger brother, Andrew, who died 23 days later.

Alexander spent his childhood in Montenegro. In 1894, his widower father took the four children, including Alexander, to Geneva where the young man completed his elementary education. Alongside his older brother George, he continued his schooling at the imperial Page Corps in St Petersburg, Russian Empire. The British historian Robert Seton-Watson described Alexander as becoming a Russophile during his time in St. Petersburg, feeling much gratitude for the willingness of the Emperor Nicholas II to give him a refuge, where he was treated with much honor and respect.

As a page, Alexander was described as hard-working and determined while also being a "loner" who kept to himself and rarely showed his feelings. Being a Karađorđević led to Alexander being invited by Nicholas II to dinner at the Winter Palace, where he was the guest of honor at meals hosted by the Russian imperial family, which was a great honor for a prince from Serbia's deposed princely family.

During his time in St. Petersburg, Alexander visited the Alexander Nevsky Monastery, where the abbot gave Alexander an icon of Prince Alexander Nevsky and guided him to the grave of Marshal Alexander Suvorov. After his visit to the monastery, Alexander expressed the wish to be a great general like Marshal Suvorov or Prince Alexander Nevsky, saying he wanted to be commanding either a great army or a great armada when he was a man.

In 1903, while young George and Alexander were in school,  a slew of conspirators pulled off a bloody coup d'état in the Kingdom of Serbia known as the May Overthrow in which King Alexander and Queen Draga were murdered and dismembered. The House of Karađorđević thus retook the Serbian throne after forty-five years and Alexander's 58-year-old father became king of Serbia, prompting George's and Alexander's return to Serbia to continue their studies. After Alexander's 15th birthday, King Peter had Alexander enlisted into the Royal Serbian Army as a private with instructions to his officers to only promote his son if he proved worthy. On 25 March 1909, Alexander was suddenly recalled to Belgrade by his father with no explanation offered other than that he had an important announcement for his son.

Becoming crown prince

A key event for Prince Alexander occurred on 27 March 1909 when his older brother, Crown Prince George, publicly renounced his claim to the throne after strong pressure from political circles in Serbia. Many in Serbia, including powerful political and military figures such as Prime Minister Nikola Pašić, as well as high-ranking officers Dragutin "Apis" Dimitrijević and Petar Živković, who did not appreciate the young man's impulsive nature and unstable, incident-prone personality, had long regarded George as unfit to rule. They believed that Prince Alexander had the makings of a fine sovereign. Prince Alexander donated a large sum of money to the Black Hand-oriented journal Pijemont (Piedmont) (founded in August 1911).

George killed his servant Kolaković by kicking him in the stomach, which served as the final straw. The death caused a huge scandal amongst the Serbian public as well as in the Austro-Hungarian press, which reported extensively on it, and 21-year-old Prince George was forced into renouncing his claim to the throne.

In 1910, Crown Prince Alexander nearly died from stomach typhus and was left with stomach problems for the rest of his life. In the run-up to the First Balkan War of 1912–1913, Alexander played the role of a diplomat, visiting Sofia to meet Tsar Ferdinand of Bulgaria for secret talks for a Balkan League, which was intended to drive the Ottomans out of the Balkans. Both Bulgaria and Serbia had rival claims to the Ottoman region of Macedonia, and the talks with Ferdinand were difficult. Together with Tsar Ferdinand's son, Crown Prince Boris (the future Tsar Boris III of Bulgaria), Alexander traveled to Saint Petersburg to see the Russian Emperor Nicholas II to ask for Russian mediation on certain points that were dividing the Serbs and Bulgarians. In March 1912, Serbia and Bulgaria signed a defensive alliance that was later (May 1912) joined by Greece.

Balkan wars and World War I

In March 1912, Alexander had a meeting with ten senior military commanders. They all agreed to end all internal conflicts in the army and fully commit to realizing national goals, which allowed space for consolidation before the two successive Balkan wars.

In the First Balkan War in 1912, as commander of the First Army, Crown Prince Alexander fought victorious battles in Kumanovo and Bitola. One of Alexander's most cherished moments came when he drove the Ottomans out of Kosovo and on 28 October 1912 led the Serb Army on a review on the Field of Blackbirds. The Field of Blackbirds was where the Serbs under Prince Lazar had been defeated in a legendary battle by the Ottoman Sultan Murad I on 28 June 1389 and is regarded by the Serbs as holy ground. It was a great honor for him to pay his respects to the Serbs who had fallen in that earlier battle. In the aftermath of the First Balkan War, disputes emerged among the victors over control of Macedonia, and Serbia and Greece signed an alliance against Bulgaria. Later in 1913, during the Second Balkan War, Alexander commanded the Serb Army at the Battle of Bregalnica against the Bulgarians.

After the Ottoman withdrawal from Skopje (most of whom had left after the Albanian revolt of 1912), Prince Alexander was met with flowers by the local people. He stopped and asked a seven-year-old girl, Vaska Zoicheva, "What are you?" When she replied "Bulgarian!" (Blgarka!), the prince slapped her and said "You are not Bulgarian. Fuck your father!".
This news of the event spread quickly around Bulgaria. In 1920 and 1921, Serbian authorities searched for the girl's father, Danail Zoichev, and offered him money to renounce the event as fictional, but he refused.

In the aftermath of the Second Balkan War, Prince Alexander took sides in the complicated power struggle over how Macedonia should be administered. In this, Alexander bested Colonel Dragutin Dimitrijević "Apis" and in the wake of this, Alexander's father, King Peter, agreed to hand over royal powers to his son. Though Colonel Dimitrijević was the mastermind of the 1903 coup that had restored the House of Karađorđević to the Serbian throne, Alexander distrusted him, regarding his attempts to set himself up as a "kingmaker" and to have the Serbian Army be a "state within the state" existing outside of civilian control as a major threat.

Additionally, Alexander saw Dimitrijević as an irresponsible intriguer who having betrayed one king might always betray another. In January 1914, the Serbian prime minister Nikola Pašić sent a letter to the Emperor Nicholas II in which King Peter expressed a desire for his son to marry one of the daughters of Nicholas. Nicholas in his reply stated that his daughters would not be forced into arranged marriages, but noted Alexander on his most recent trips to St. Petersburg had during dinners at the Winter Palace kept giving loving looks at the Grand Duchess Tatiana, leading him to guess that it was her whom Alexander wanted to marry. On 24 June 1914, Alexander became regent of Serbia.

On 24 July 1914, Alexander was one of the first Serbian officials to see the Austrian ultimatum containing terms deliberately written to inspire rejection. Turning to Russia for help, Alexander was advised to help the ultimatum as much as he could. Alexander was late to say he "went as far as an independent could" to accept the ultimatum, as Serbia accepted all of the terms except for the one demanding that Austrian police officers investigating the assassination of Archduke Franz Ferdinand could operate on Serbian soil with the powers of arrest, which would have been the effective end of Serbia as an independent state. As expected, the Austrians declared war on Serbia, and Alexander threw himself into preparing his nation's defense. In a letter to King Nicholas of Montenegro, Alexander wrote: "God has willed yet again that the Serbian people should give their lives for Serbs everywhere ... I pray for the support of my dear and wise forefathers".

At the outbreak of World War I he was the nominal supreme commander of the Serbian army; true command was in the hands of the Chief of Staff of Supreme Headquarters, a position held by Stepa Stepanović (during the mobilisation), Radomir Putnik (1914–1915), Petar Bojović (1916–1917) and Živojin Mišić (1918). The Serbian army distinguished itself in the battles at Cer and at the Drina (the Battle of Kolubara) in 1914, scoring victories against the invading Austro-Hungarian forces and evicting them from the country.

The British historian Max Hastings described the Royal Serbian Army in 1914 as the toughest army in Europe and also the most egalitarian with none of the distinctions of rank that characterized the other European armies, exemplified by how the Serb Army was the only army in Europe where officers would shake hands with the other ranks. However, the Serbian Army suffered major shortages of equipment with a third of the men called up in August 1914 having no rifles or ammunition and new recruits being advised to bring their own boots and clothing as there were no uniforms for them. Alexander ordered the Serbian police to conduct searches of houses all over Serbia to see if there were any rifles and ammunition to be seized for the army.

In 1915, the Serbian army was attacked on several fronts by the allied forces of Germany and Austria-Hungary, suffering heavy losses. On 7 October 1915 an Austro-German army group under the command of Field Marshal August von Mackensen invaded Serbia and after encountering fierce resistance took Belgrade on 9 October. On 14 October 1915, Bulgaria invaded Serbia and on 16 October the Bulgarians took Niš, severing the railroad that linked Serbia to Salonika in Greece. Being attacked from the north by the Austrians and the Germans and from the south by the Bulgarians, the Serbs by 25 November 1915 had been forced into the Kosovo region.

The massacres committed by the Austrians in 1914 when they invaded Serbia twice caused enormous panic and hundreds of thousands of Serbs fled their homes to escape the Austrians, which greatly delayed the movement of the Serb Army. Field Marshal Radomir Putnik persuaded Crown Prince Alexander and King Peter that it was better to keep the Serb Army intact to one day liberate Serbia rather to stand and fight in Kosovo as many Serb officers wanted.

The Serbian Army withdrew through the gorges of Montenegro and northern Albania to the Greek island of Corfu, where it was reorganized. The march across the Prokletije ("accursed") mountains was a harrowing one as the Serb Army together with a mass of refugees had to cross mountains that rose to 3,000 feet high in the middle of winter with the average daily temperature being −20° while battling the hostile Albanian tribes with the armies of Austria, Germany and Bulgaria in pursuit. Many Serbs died along the way as one Serb soldier wrote in his diary how the refugees rested by the side of the road were: "Immobilized by the snow their heads rest to their breasts. The white snowflakes dance around them while the alpine winds whistle their songs of death. The heads of horses and oxen which have fallen protrude from the snow".

As the Serbs braved the icy winds and snowdrifts, the only consolation for Alexander was that the winter weather was also delaying the German, Austrian and Bulgarian armies under the command of von Mackensen that were pursuing his army. Alexander repeatedly exposed himself to danger during the march to the sea while his health declined. Upon reaching the sea, the surviving Serbs who numbered about 140,000 were rescued by British and French ships, which took them to Corfu.

In September 1915, the Royal Serbian Army was estimated to have the strength of about 420,000 men, of whom 94,000 had been killed or wounded while another 174,000 had been captured or were missing during the fall campaign in 1915 and the subsequent retreat to the sea. The losses taken by Serb civilians during the autumn campaign in 1915 together with the retreat to the sea have never been calculated, but are estimated to be massive.  The situation was further worsened by the outbreak of a typhus and relapsing fever epidemic which ravaged the country in 1915. Serb losses as a percentage of the population were the greatest of any belligerent in the war.

The surviving Serb soldiers were ultimately taken to Thessaloniki to join the Armées alliées en Orient. In the fall of 1916, Alexander's long-standing dispute with the Black Hand group came to a head, when Colonel Dimitrijević began to criticize his leadership. Suspecting a threat to the throne, Alexander promptly had officers who were members of the Black Hand arrested in December 1916 and tried for insubordination; after their convictions, Dimitrijević and several other Black Hand leaders were executed by firing squad on 23 June 1917.

At the same time, the Serbian government-in-exile led by Prime Minister Nikola Pašić was in contact with the Yugoslav Committee, a group of anti-Habsburg Croats and Slovenes led by Ante Trumbić who talked about creating a new nation to be called Yugoslavia which would unite all of the South Slav peoples into one state. In June 1917, the Corfu Declaration was signed by Pašić and Trumbić promising Yugoslavia after the war.

Alexander seems to have been dubious about the plans for Yugoslavia, as throughout the war, he spoke in terms of liberating Serbia. The introduction of the 14 Points by the American President Woodrow Wilson in January 1918 increased Alexander's doubts about Yugoslavia as Point 10 spoke of "substantial autonomy" in the Austrian Empire after the war, not breaking it up. Not willing to antagonise Wilson, Alexander favored a "greater Serbia" that saw the Serbs annex certain provinces of the Austrian Empire. Though the Crown Prince declared in a speech during a visit to Britain that he was "fighting for Yugoslav unity in a Yugoslav state", when he addressed his own soldiers he stated he was fighting for "the reestablishment of Serbia, our dear homeland".

In a sign of the trouble to come, Trumbić demanded to have the right to speak for the South Slavs living under Austrian rule, a demand that Alexander rejected under the grounds that the Serb government represented the South Slavs. After the army was regrouped and reinforced, it achieved a decisive victory on the Macedonian Front, at Kajmakcalan. The Serbian army carried out a major part in the final Allied breakthrough on the Macedonian Front in the autumn of 1918. The debate whatever the Serbian Army was fighting for Yugoslavia or Serbia resolved itself in October–November 1918 as the Austrian Empire collapsed, leaving the Royal Serbian Army to move into the vacuum.

The Italians had ambitions to annex Dalmatia, Istria and much of Slovenia, leading the Croats and the Slovenes to prefer living with their fellow Slavs. On 1 December 1918, the National Council asked Alexander to declare Serbia united with the former Austrian provinces of Bosnia, Croatia and Slovenia on the basis of the Corfu declaration. Serbia had been devastated by the war, and 1 out of every 5 Serbs who were alive in 1914 were dead by 1918. Much of Alexander's time in the immediate post-war years was to be taken up with reconstruction.

King of Yugoslavia

On 1 December 1918, in a prearranged set piece, Alexander, as Prince Regent, received a delegation of the People's Council of Slovenes, Croats and Serbs, an address was read out by one of the delegation, and Alexander made an address in acceptance. This was considered to be the birth of the Kingdom of Serbs, Croats and Slovenes. One of Alexander's first acts as Prince Regent of the new kingdom was to declare his support for the widespread demand for land reform, stating: "In our free state there can and will be only free landowners".

On 25 February 1919, Alexander signed a land reform decree breaking up all feudal estates over the size of 100 cadastral yokes with compensation to be paid for the former landowners except for those who belonged to the House of Habsburg and the other ruling families of enemy states in the Great War. Under the land reform decree some two million hectares of land was handed over to a half million peasant households, though the implementation was very slow, taking 15 years before land reform was complete.

In both Macedonia and Bosnia-Herzegovina, the majority of the landlords who lost land were Muslims while the majority of their former tenants who received the land were Christians, and in both places land reform was seen as an attack on the political and economic power of the Muslim gentry. In Croatia, Slovenia, and Vojvodina, the majority of the landlords who lost their land were Austrian or Hungarian nobility who usually did not reside in those places, meaning that however much they might have resented the loss of their land it did not have the sort of political repercussions it did in Macedonia and in Bosnia where the Albanian and Bosnian Muslim landlords lived.

On August 16, 1921, upon the death of his father, Alexander ascended to the throne of the Kingdom of Serbs, Croats and Slovenes, which from its inception was colloquially known both in the Kingdom and the rest of Europe alike as Yugoslavia. The historian Brigit Farley described Alexander as something of a cipher to historians as he was a taciturn and reserved man who loathed to express his feelings either in person or in writing. As Alexander kept no diary or wrote no memoirs, Farley wrote that any biography of Alexander could easily be titled "In search of King Alexander" as he remains an elusive and enigmatic figure.

The British historian R.W. Seton-Watson, who knew Alexander well, called him a soldiery man most comfortable in a military milieu who was very quiet and surprisingly modest for a king. Seton-Watson described Alexander as having an "autocratic" personality, a man who was first and foremost a soldier who spent "six of his formative years" in the Serbian Army, which left him with a "military outlook which unfitted him to deal with the delicate problems of constitutional government and which made compromise hard for him".

Seton-Watson wrote that Alexander "...was very courageous, though not ever a man of strong physique or robust health. He had a strong fixity of purpose, great devotion to duty, powers of sustained work. He had great charm and simplicity of manner. He was accessible and very open to opinions-though he rarely acted on them, and though occasionally he reacted with positive violence, as in the case of the Slovene Zerjav who fainted in his presence."

One of the things that historians can be certain about Alexander was his belief in keeping Yugoslavia as a unitary state and his consistent opposition to federalism, which he believed would lead to the break-up of Yugoslavia and perhaps his own assassination. In turn, Alexander's opposition to federalism related to his belief that in a federalised Yugoslavia, the prečani Serbs would be discriminated against by the Croats and Bosnian Muslims, once telling a Serb Orthodox priest that federalism would be "stabbing the Serbs in the back".

As a Karađorđević, Alexander was very conscious of the long blood-feud between the Houses of Obrenović and Karađorđević that had disfigured Serb politics in the 19th century and that the 1903 coup d'état that finally brought down the Obrenovićs and led to the Karađorđevićs regaining the throne had happened because the last Obrenović king, Alexander, was widely viewed as too subservient to Austria-Hungary and as having betrayed Serb interests. Because of the frequent changes in loyalty in the Royal Serbian Army in the 19th century between the feuding royal families, Alexander was never entirely convinced that the Serb-dominated officer corps of the Royal Yugoslav Army were completely loyal to him, and always had the fear if he was seen to be betraying Serbdom as the last Obrenović king was, he too might be overthrown and killed.

On 8 June 1922, he married Princess Maria of Romania, who was a daughter of Ferdinand I of Romania. They had three sons: Crown Prince Peter, and Princes Tomislav and Andrej. He was said to have wished to marry Grand Duchess Tatiana Nikolaevna of Russia, a cousin of his wife and the second daughter of Tsar Nicholas II, and was distraught by her untimely death in the Russian Civil War. The Russophile Alexander was horrified by the murders of the House of Romanov-including the Grand Duchess Tatiana-and during his reign was very hostile towards the Soviet Union, welcoming Russian emigres to Belgrade.

The lavish royal wedding to Princess Maria of Romania was intended to cement the alliance with Romania, a fellow "victor nation" in World War I which like Yugoslavia had territorial disputes with the defeated nations like Hungary and Bulgaria. For Alexander, the royal wedding was especially satisfactory as most of the royal families of Europe attended, which showed that the House of Karađorđević, a family of peasant origins who were disliked for slaughtering the rival House of Obrenović in 1903, were finally accepted by the rest of European royalty.

In foreign policy, Alexander favored maintaining the international system created in 1918–19, and in 1921 Yugoslavia joined the Little Entente with Czechoslovakia and Romania to guard against Hungary. Hungary refused to accept the Treaty of Trianon and made territorial claims against all three states of the Little Entente.

In 1921, a war veteran and communist Spasoje Stejić Baćo attempted to assassinate king Alexander by throwing a bomb at his carriage. The bomb was thrown from a balcony and it got stuck in the telephone wires and it ended up wounding several bystanders.

The principal enemy of Yugoslavia in the 1920s was Fascist Italy, which wanted much of what is now modern Slovenia and Croatia. The origins of the Italo-Yugoslav dispute concerned the Italian contention that they had been "cheated" out of what they had been promised in the secret Treaty of London in 1915 at the Paris peace conference in 1919. It was largely out of the fear of Italy that Alexander in 1927 signed a treaty of alliance with France, which therefore became Yugoslavia's principal ally. In fact, Alexander I and Benito Mussolini were arch-rivals.

Starting in 1926, an alliance of the Serb Democrats led by Svetozar Pribićević and the Croat Peasant Party led by Stjepan Radić had systematically obstructed the skupština to press for federalism for Yugoslavia, filibustering and filing nonsensical motions to prevent the government from passing any bills. In response to obstructionism from the opposition parties, in June 1928, one frustrated deputy from Montenegro took out his handgun and shot Radić on the floor of the skupština. The charismatic Radić, the "uncrowned king of Croatia", had inspired intense devotion in Croatia and his assassination was seen as a sort of Serb declaration of war. The assassination pushed Yugoslavia to the brink of civil war and led Alexander to consider the "amputation" of Croatia as preferable to federalism.

Alexander mused to Pribićević that: "We cannot stay together with the Croats. Since we cannot, it would be better to separate. The best way to be to effect a peaceful separation like Sweden and Norway did". When Pribićević protested that this would be an act of "treason", Alexander told him he would think some more about what to do. Alexander appointed the Slovene Catholic priest, Father Anton Korošec prime minister with one mandate, namely to stop the slide towards civil war. On 1 December 1928, the lavish celebrations of the 10th anniversary of the founding of the triune Kingdom of Serbs, Croats and Slovenes that the government organized led to rioting that left 10 dead in Zagreb.

In response to the political crisis triggered by the assassination of Stjepan Radić, King Alexander abolished the Constitution on 6 January 1929, prorogued the Parliament and introduced a personal dictatorship (the so-called "January 6th Dictatorship", Šestojanuarska diktatura). One of the first acts of the new regime was to carry out a purge of the civil service with one-third of the civil service being fired by May 1929 in an attempt to address popular complaints about rampant corruption in the bureaucracy. He also changed the name of the country to the Kingdom of Yugoslavia and changed the internal divisions from the 33 oblasts to nine new banovinas on 3 October. Of the banovinas, only one had a Slovene majority, two had Croat majorities and the rest had Serb majorities, which especially angered the Bosnian Muslims who were in a minority in every banovine.

The way in which the banovinas were based on new borders that did not correspond to the historical regional borders led to much resentment, especially in Bosnia and Croatia. The banovinas were named after the topography of Yugoslavia rather than the historical names in a bid to weaken regional loyalties, being governed by bans appointed by the King. In the same month, he tried to banish by decree the use of Serbian Cyrillic to promote the exclusive use of the Latin alphabet in Yugoslavia.

Alexander replaced the three regional flags for the triune Kingdom of Serbs, Croats and Slovenes with a single flag for the entire country, brought in a single legal code for his realm, imposed a single fiscal code so all of his subjects would pay the same tax rate, and a Yugoslav Agrarian Bank was created by merging all of the regional agrarian banks into one. Alexander tried to promote a sense of Yugoslav identity by always taking his vacations in Slovenia, naming his second son after a Croat king, and being a godfather to a Bosnian Muslim child. Alexander had once fraternised frequently with ordinary people, being known for his habit of making unannounced visits to various villages all over Yugoslavia to chat with ordinary people but after the proclamation of the royal dictatorship, his social circle consisted of a few generals and courtiers, causing the King to lose touch with his subjects.

Within Serbia, the royal dictatorship for the first time made Alexander into an unpopular figure. The British historian Richard Crampton wrote many Serbs "...were alienated by the attempt, albeit unsuccessful, to lessen the Serbian domination on which, to add insult to injury, many of the faults of the previous system were blamed. Alexander had implicitly made the Serbs, the most reliable proponents of centralism, the villains of the Vidovdan piece". The royal dictatorship was seen in Croatia as merely a form of Serbian domination, and one result was a marked upswing in support for fascistic Ustashe, which advocated winning Croat independence via violence.

By 1931, the Ustashe was waging a terrorist campaign of bombings, assassinations and sabotage, which at least in part explained Alexander's reluctance to engage with ordinary people as he done in the past out of the fear of assassination. On 14 February 1931, Alexander visited Zagreb, and the men of the Turnopolje district, who for centuries always provided a mounted honour guard for any royal visitor to Zagreb, failed to show up, a snub that shown how unpopular Alexander had become in Croatia. On 19 February 1931, the Croat historian Milan Šufflay was murdered by police agents, becoming an international cause célèbre with Albert Einstein and Heinrich Mann leading a campaign to pressure Alexander to prosecute Šufflay's killers.

The Great Depression was especially severe in predominantly rural Yugoslavia as it caused deflation leading to a collapse in price of agricultural products. The Croat politician Ante Trumbić summed up the feelings of many when he gave a speech in early 1931 stating: "We are in a crisis, an economic, financial and moral crisis. There is no material or moral credit in the country. Nobody believes anything anymore!" However, Alexander remain unperturbed, stating in an interview with the press: "Yugoslav politics will never again be driven by narrow religious, regional or national interests". In response to pressure from Yugoslavia's allies, especially France and Czechoslovakia, led Alexander to decide to lessen the royal dictatorship by bringing in a new constitution which allowed the skupština to meet again.

In 1931, Alexander decreed a new Constitution which transferred executive power to the King. Elections were to be by universal male suffrage. The provision for a secret ballot was dropped and pressure on public employees to vote for the governing party was to be a feature of all elections held under Alexander's constitution. Furthermore, the King would appoint half of the upper house directly, and legislation could become law with the approval of one of the houses alone if it were also approved by the King. The 1931 constitution kept Yugoslavia as a unitary state, which enraged the non-Serbian peoples who demanded a federation and saw Alexander's royal dictatorship as thinly disguised Serbian domination. In the elections for the skupština in December 1931 – January 1932, the call of the opposition parties to boycott the vote were widely heeded, a sign of popular dissatisfaction with the new constitution.

In response to the impoverishment of the countryside caused by the Great Depression, Alexander reaffirmed in a speech the right of every peasant family to a minimum amount of land that could not be seized by a bank in the event of a debt default. In 1932 he issued a decree suspending all debt payments by farmers to the banks for six months and forbade any more foreclosures by the banks against farmers. Alexander's measures preventing the banks to foreclose on farmers who were unable to pay their loans saved many peasants from being ruined and prevented economic distress in the countryside from turning political, but in the long run, his policies did not solve the economic problems of the rural areas.

The losses taken by the banks and their inability to foreclose on farmers who had delinquent loans made the banks unwilling to make new loans to the farmers. As Yugoslav agriculture, especially in the southern parts of the country was backward, the farmers needed loans to modernise their farms, but the unwillingness of the banks to lend to the farmers made modernisation of the farms impossible in the 1930s.

In September 1932, Alexander's friend, the Croat politician Ante Trumbić gave an interview with The Manchester Guardian newspaper, where he stated that life for ordinary Croats was better when they were part of the Austrian empire and stated that perhaps the Croats would be better off if they broke away from Yugoslavia to form their own state. For Alexander, who always respected and liked Trumbić to see his former friend come very close to embracing Croat separatism was a painful blow. On 7 November 1932, Trumbić and Vladko Maček of the Croat Peasant Party issued the so-called Zagreb Points, which demanded a new constitution which would turn Yugoslavia into a federation, and stated that the Croats would otherwise demand independence.

Alexander had Maček imprisoned without charges, but the issuing of the Zagreb Points inspired the other peoples to issue similar declarations with the Slovenes issuing the Ljubljana Points, the Bosnian Muslims issuing the Sarajevo Points and the Magyars issuing the Novi Sad points. The emergence of a multi-ethnic opposition movement embracing the non-Serb peoples threatened to break the country apart and forced Alexander to ease the level of repression as his ministers warned him that he could not imprison the entire country.

In Macedonia, the Internal Macedonian Revolutionary Organisation was continuing its long-running guerrilla struggle while in Croatia the security situation had further deteriorated by 1932. By the end of 1932, the Ustashe had blown up hundreds of trains and assassinated hundreds of government officials. The often violent response of the mainly-Serb gendarmes to Ustashe terrorism fuelled more support for the Ustashe. To many, it appeared that Yugoslavia was sliding into the civil war that Alexander's "self-coup" of January 1929 was supposed to prevent.

Starting in 1933, Alexander had become worried about Nazi Germany. In March 1933, the French minister in Belgrade, Paul-Émile Naggiar, told Alexander that France was seriously worried about the stability of Yugoslavia and warned that the King could not continue to rule in face of opposition from the majority of his subjects and that Paris viewed that Alexander was starting to become a liability for France. Naggiar predicted the new regime in Germany was going to challenge the international order created by the Treaty of Versailles sooner or later and that France needed Yugoslavia to be stable and strong, which led Naggiar to advise the King to adopt federalism for his realm.

However, one point of agreement of Alexander with Mussolini was his fear of Anschluss which would make Germany a direct neighbour of Yugoslavia. Alexander had no desire to have Germany as a neighbour, which led him to support the continuation of Austrian independence. Despite his distaste for communism, the King gave support, albeit in a very cautious and hesitant way, to the plans of French Foreign Minister Louis Barthou to bring the Soviet Union into a front meant to contain Germany. In 1933–34, Alexander become the proponent of a Balkan Pact, which would unite Yugoslavia, Greece, Romania and Turkey.

Although the Balkan Pact was directed primarily against Italy and its allies (Hungary, Albania and Bulgaria), Alexander hoped the pact might provide some protection against Germany. After the coup d'état in May 1934 in Sofia, King Alexander also hoped that Bulgaria would join the Balkan Entente. The new Bulgarian government had started repression against IMRO. In September 1934, Alexander visited Sofia to improve relations with Bulgaria. A Bulgarian military organisation, Zveno, supported the unification of Bulgaria and Albania into Yugoslavia, which agreed with Alexander's policy, Balkans for the Balkan peoples.

Assassination of Alexander I
After the Ustaše's Velebit uprising in November 1932, Alexander said through an intermediary to the Italian government, "If you want to have serious riots in Yugoslavia or cause a regime change, you need to kill me. Shoot at me and be sure you have finished me off, because that's the only way to make changes in Yugoslavia."

The French Foreign Minister Louis Barthou had attempted in 1934 to build an alliance meant to contain Germany, consisting of France's allies in Eastern Europe like Yugoslavia, together with Italy and the Soviet Union. The long-standing rivalry between Benito Mussolini and King Alexander had complicated Barthou's work as Alexander complained about Italian claims against his country together with Italian support for Hungarian revisionism and the Croat Ustaše.

As long as the French ally Yugoslavia continued to have disputes with Italy, Barthou's plans for an Italo-French rapprochement would be stillborn. During a visit to Belgrade in June 1934, Barthou promised the King that France would pressure Mussolini into signing a treaty under which he would renounce his claims against Yugoslavia. Alexander was sceptical of Barthou's plan, noting that there were hundreds of Ustašhi being sheltered in Italy and it was rumoured that Mussolini had financed an unsuccessful attempt by the Ustaše to assassinate him in December 1933.

Mussolini had come to believe that it was only the personality of Alexander that was holding Yugoslavia together and that if the King were assassinated, Yugoslavia would descend into civil war, which would allow Italy to annex certain regions of Yugoslavia without the fear of France. However, France was Yugoslavia's closest ally, and Barthou invited Alexander for a visit to France to sign a Franco-Yugoslav agreement that would allow Barthou to "go to Rome with the certainty of success". As a result of the previous deaths of three family members on Tuesdays, Alexander refused to undertake any public functions on that day of the week. On Tuesday, 9 October 1934, however, he had no choice, as he was arriving in Marseille to start a state visit to France to strengthen both countries' alliance in the Little Entente.

While Alexander was being slowly driven in a car through the streets along with French Foreign Minister Barthou, a gunman, the Bulgarian Vlado Chernozemski, stepped from the street and shot the King twice and the chauffeur with a Mauser C96 semiautomatic pistol. Alexander died in the car and was slumped backwards in the seat with his eyes open. Barthou was also killed by a stray bullet fired by French police during the scuffle following the attack. Lieutenant-Colonel Piollet, having finally managed to turn his horse, struck the assailant with his sword. Ten people in the procession were wounded, including General Alphonse Georges was hit by two bullets as he tried to intervene, and nine people in the crowd who came to see the king, four of them fatally, among them Yolande Farris, barely 20 years old, on Place Castellane, who came to the Palais de la Bourse to see the king. She was hit by a stray bullet and died at the Hôtel-Dieu on October 11, 1934. Mrs. Dumazet and Durbec, who also came to see the king, also died.

It was one of the first assassinations to be captured on film; the shooting occurred in front of the newsreel cameraman, who was only metres away at the time. While the exact moment of shooting was not captured on film, the events leading to the assassination and the immediate aftermath were. The body of the chauffeur Foissac, who had been mortally wounded, slumped and jammed against the brakes of the car, which allowed the cameraman to continue filming from within inches of the King for a number of minutes afterwards. 
The film record of Alexander I's assassination remains one of the most notable pieces of newsreel in existence, alongside the film of Emperor Nicholas II of Russia's coronation, the funerals of Queen Victoria of the United Kingdom (see state funeral of Queen Victoria) and Emperor Franz Joseph I of Austria, and the assassination of John F. Kennedy. A 20th Century Fox newsreel presented by Graham McNamee was manipulated to give the audience the impression that the assassination had been captured on film. Three identical gunshot sounds were added to the film afterwards, but in reality, Chernozemski fired his handgun over ten times and killed or wounded a total of 15 people. A straw hat is shown on the ground, as if it had belonged to the assassin, unlike in reality. A Mauser C96 semi-automatic pistol with a 10-round magazine is shown as the assassination weapon, but the actual one had a 20-round magazine. The exact moment of assassination was never filmed. Just hours later, Chernozemski died in police custody.

The assassin was a member of the pro-Bulgarian Internal Macedonian Revolutionary Organization (IMRO or VMRO) and an experienced marksman. Immediately after assassinating King Alexander, Chernozemski was cut down by the sword of a mounted French policeman, and then beaten by the crowd. By the time that he was removed from the scene, the King was already dead. The IMRO was a political organization that fought for the liberation of the occupied region of Macedonia and its independence, initially as some form of second Bulgarian state, followed by a later unification with the Kingdom of Bulgaria.

The IMRO worked in alliance with the Croatian Ustaše group, led by Ante Pavelić. Chernozemski and three Croatian accomplices had travelled to France from Hungary via Switzerland. After the assassination, Chernozemski's accomplices were arrested by French police. A prominent diplomat with the Palazzo Chigi, Baron Pompeo Aloisi, expressed fears that the Ustashi based in Italy had killed the King and sought reassurances from another diplomat, Paolo Cortese, that Italy had not been involved. Aloisi was not reassured when Cortese told him that with Alexander being dead, Yugoslavia was about to break up.

Public opinion and press in Yugoslavia held that Italy had been crucial in the planning and directing of the assassination. Demonstrators outside of the Italian embassy in Belgrade and the Italian consulates in Zagreb and Ljubljana blamed Mussolini for Alexander's assassination. An investigation by the French police quickly established that the assassins had been trained and armed in Hungary; had travelled to France on forged Czechoslovak passports; and frequently telephoned Ustaše leader Ante Pavelić, who was living in Italy.

The incident was later used by Yugoslavia as an argument to counter the Croatian attempts of secession and Italian and Hungarian revisionism. The participants in the assassination were Ivan Rajić, Mijo Kralj, Zvonimir Pospišil and Antun Godina. They were sentenced to life in prison although the Yugoslav authorities had expected that they would be sentenced to death. In 1940, after the fall of France, they were released from prison by Germany.

Pierre Laval, who succeeded Barthou as foreign minister, wished to continue the rapprochement with Rome and saw the assassinations in Marseille as an inconvenience that was best forgotten. Both London and Paris made it clear that they regarded Mussolini as a responsible European statesman and in private told Belgrade that under no circumstances would they allow Il Duce to be blamed. In a speech in Northampton, England, on 19 October 1934, British Foreign Secretary Sir John Simon expressed his sympathy to the people of Yugoslavia over the king's assassination and stated that he was convinced by Mussolini's speech in Milan that denied being involvement in the assassination.

When Yugoslavia made an extradition request to Italy for Pavelić on charges of regicide, the Quai d'Orsay expressed concern that if Pavelić were extradited, he might incriminate Mussolini and were greatly reassured when its counterparts at the Palazzo Chigi stated there was no possibility of Pavelić being extradited. Laval cynically told a French journalist off the record that the French press should stop going on about the assassinations in Marseille because France would never go to war to defend the honour of a weak country like Yugoslavia.

The following day, the body of King Alexander I was transported back to the port of Split in Yugoslavia by the destroyer JRM Dubrovnik. After a huge funeral in Belgrade that was attended by about 500,000 people and many leading European statesmen, Alexander was interred in the Oplenac Church in Topola, which had been built by his father. The Holy See gave special permission to bishops Aloysius Stepinac, Antun Akšamović, Dionisije Njaradi, and Gregorij Rožman to attend the funeral in an Orthodox church. As his son King Peter II was still a minor, Alexander's first cousin Prince Paul took the regency of the Kingdom of Yugoslavia.

A ballistic report on the bullets found in the car was made in 1935, but its results were not made available to the public until 1974. It revealed that Barthou was hit by an 8 mm Modèle 1892 revolver round commonly used in weapons, carried by French police.

After the assassination, relations between Yugoslavia and France became colder and never returned to the previous level. Also, the Little Entente and the Balkan Pact lost their importance. The Yugoslav public considered it shocking that the assassination had happened on French soil. In the coming years, Prince Paul (as regent) attempted to keep a neutral balance between London and Berlin until 1941, when he yielded to heavy pressure to join the Tripartite Pact.

Issue

In popular culture
 The song "Don Juan" by British synth duo Pet Shop Boys (the B-side to their 1988 single "Domino Dancing") contains the phrase "King Zog's back from holiday, Marie Lupescu's grey and King Alexander is dead in Marseille".(21)
 In Upton Sinclair's historical novel, "Wide Is The Gate" (novel 4 in the Lanny Budd series published 1941) the assassination is attributed to the Nazi German government. The novel claims funds and a forged passport were obtained by the Croatian assassin from the head of German foreign policy department.
 A heavily fictionalized version of the assassination serves as the opening to the book The Second Assassin by Christopher Hyde. The gunman is changed to a Croatian, while an Irish hitman kills both him and Barthou using a rifle, undetected in the confusion. It is described as masterminded by Nazi Germany to get rid of both Alexander and Barthou while they are together.
 In Ivan Vazov's poem "Па ща си ти?" ("What are you?") is depicted a case when crown prince Alexander asks the question to a little girl from Skopje and when she answers 'I'm Bulgarian' he slaps her in the face. The poem emphasizes the suffering of the Macedonian Bulgarians under Serbian rule.
 TV series Alexander of Yugoslavia directed by Zdravko Šotra

Honours

References and notes
Notes

  "The first central committee of IMRO. Memoirs of d-r Hristo Tatarchev", Materials for the Macedonian liberation movement, book IX (series of the Macedonian scientific institute of IMRO, led by Bulgarian academician prof. Lyubomir Miletich), Sofia, 1928, p. 102, поредица "Материяли за историята на македонското освободително движение" на Македонския научен институт на ВМРО, воден от българския академик проф. Любомир Милетич, книга IX, София, 1928.
 
 

Bibliography

External links

Wedding of King Alexander I and Princess Maria at Belgrade (1922), British Pathé
 The first recorded sound movie of speech of the king Alexander I (Under of Yugoslav Sky, 1933 – Yugoslav Film Archive)
 Newsreel footage of the Assassination of King Alexander
 The Funeral of King Alexander I of Yugoslavia at Belgrade (1934), British Pathé
 The Official Website of the Serbian Royal Family
Royal Mausoleum Oplenac
 

1888 births
1934 deaths
1934 murders in France
20th-century Serbian monarchs
Kings of Yugoslavia
Karađorđević dynasty
People from Cetinje
Regents
Eastern Orthodox monarchs
Murdered Serbian monarchs
Assassinated Yugoslav people
Assassinated heads of state
20th-century murdered monarchs
Filmed assassinations
Serbian people murdered abroad
Deaths by firearm in France
Assassinations in France
Male murder victims
Grand Crosses of the Virtuti Militari
Recipients of the Order of St. Anna, 1st class
Recipients of the Order of St. George of the Third Degree
Grand Masters of the Order of the Yugoslav Crown
Burials at the Mausoleum of the Royal House of Karađorđević, Oplenac
Yugoslav anti-communists
Terrorism deaths in France
Articles containing video clips
Regents of Serbia
Grand Crosses of the Order of the Sun of Peru
3
3
3
Collars of the Order of the White Lion
Honorary Knights Grand Cross of the Order of the Bath
Honorary Knights Grand Cross of the Royal Victorian Order
Yugoslavism
Serbs of Montenegro
Recipients of the Order of the White Eagle (Poland)